RUOR Yerevan, is a defunct Armenian football club from the capital Yerevan, that represented the Republican School of Olympic Reserve (Respublikansoye Uchilishe Olimpiyskogo Reserva / Республиканское Училище Олимпийского Резерва).

The club was founded in 1989 during the Soviet period on the basis of the No. 10 High School of Sport orientation of Yerevan, established in 1971.

However, the club was dissolved in early 1994 and is currently inactive from professional football.

League Record

References

Defunct football clubs in Armenia
1994 disestablishments in Armenia